Emil Hossu (24 November 1941 – 25 January 2012) was a Romanian actor.
 
Hossu was born into a Greek-Catholic family in Ocna Sibiului, Sibiu County.  He was a well-known actor of stage and screen in the 1980s and 1990s, having performed in over 50 movies and stage productions. At the time of his death, on 25 January 2012, he was performing at the Nottara Theatre in Bucharest alongside his wife, the actress Catrinel Dumitrescu. Hossu died of a cardiac arrest, just as he was about to go on stage in a play called The Anniversary. He is interred at  Bellu Cemetery in Bucharest.

Selected filmography
 Songs of the Sea (1970) - Pavel
 Accident (1976) - Lt. Nistor
 The Secret of Bacchus (1984) - Victor Mirea
 Om sărac, om bogat (2006) - Mircea Prodan
 Chiquititas (2007) - Victor Mărăscu
 Inimă de țigan (2008) - Titel   
 Fetele Marinarului (2009) - Don Juan
 Ho Ho Ho (film) (2009) - Ion's father
 Iubire și onoare (2010 - 2011) - Titus

References

External links

1941 births
2012 deaths
Romanian male stage actors
Romanian Greek-Catholics
People from Ocna Sibiului
Romanian male film actors
Burials at Bellu Cemetery
20th-century Romanian male actors
21st-century Romanian male actors
Male actors from Bucharest